Dolichoderus zherichini is an extinct species of ant in the genus Dolichoderus. Described by Dlussky and Perkovsky in 2002, the fossils were discovered in the Rovno amber, located in Ukraine.

References

†
Prehistoric insects of Europe
Fossil taxa described in 2002
Fossil ant taxa
Rovno amber